Pouria Aria Kia (Persian پوریا آریا کیا‎, born 3 May 1990) is an Iranian footballer who currently plays for Aluminium in the Persian gulf pro League.

References

External Links
 
 

Aluminium Arak players
1990 births
Living people
Iranian footballers
Association football defenders
Pars Jonoubi Jam players
Paykan F.C. players
People from Karaj
21st-century Iranian people